Laura Bruneau is a Canadian actress, best known for her lead roles in the television series Material World and Wind at My Back.

Originally from North Vancouver, British Columbia, she studied at the American Academy of Dramatic Arts for two years before returning to Canada, where she acted on stage in Vancouver and had guest roles in Hangin' In and The Beachcombers. In 1983, she was cast in the American prime time soap opera Bare Essence, which was cancelled after twelve episodes. She remained in the United States for a few more years, appearing in an episode of Knight Rider and working with a comedy troupe which produced several sketches for the syndicated series PM Magazine, before returning to Canada again when she was cast in a pilot created by Louis Del Grande which did not make it to series. She then had guest roles in Street Legal, Counterstrike and Katts and Dog, and the television film Love and Hate: The Story of Colin and JoAnn Thatcher, before being cast as Kitty, the lead character, in Material World.

After Material World was cancelled in 1993, Bruneau had guest roles in the television series Matrix, The Outer Limits and Two before being cast in Wind at My Back as Honey Bailey, following the departure of Cynthia Belliveau from the series. She played the role for the final season of the series and in the follow-up television film A Wind at My Back Christmas.

References

External links

Canadian television actresses
Actresses from British Columbia
Living people
Year of birth missing (living people)